The Shen'ao Power Plant was a coal-fired power plant in Ruifang District, New Taipei, Taiwan.

History
The power plant started operating in 1960. In 1965, trains began carrying coal to the power plant from coal mines in Ruifang. It was decommissioned in 2007.

See also
 List of power stations in Taiwan

References

1960 establishments in Taiwan
2007 disestablishments in Taiwan
Buildings and structures in New Taipei
Coal-fired power stations in Taiwan
Demolished buildings and structures in Taiwan
Energy infrastructure completed in 1960